Space Adventure Cobra: The Movie, known in Japan as , is a 1982 Japanese animated science fiction film directed by Osamu Dezaki based on Buichi Terasawa's 1978 manga Cobra.

Plot
Space Adventure Cobra: The Movie opens with bounty hunter Jane Flowers apparently killing a creature and taking its head away. As she boasts in a bar, the self-proclaimed "Cobra" is attracted to and tails her. She doubts his identity since Cobra is said to have died two years ago and to have had a special weapon called "Psychogun" in his left arm. When Cobra visits Jane in her home, the creature's head attacks them, but it is ultimately killed by Jane. She suspects a criminal group called the "Pirate Guild" to be responsible for the attack, as she is on their hit list and earlier left the head to the care of a bounty hunter organization. When the Guild's death squad chases them, Cobra reveals his signature weapon to stop their enemies. This fact is reported to Crystal Bowie, Cobra's archenemy, and Jane reveals she had been looking for Cobra's help.

Cobra and Jane meet Cobra's partner Lady Armaroid and they board his starship to go to Sido, a planet where Jane's sister Catherine is imprisoned. When they arrive on the planet, Jane says Catherine was falsely accused and is in prison because of the Guild, so she needs Cobra's help to sneak in and release her. Cobra enters alone, defeats some enemies, finds Catherine, but is ultimately captured and cryogenized by Bowie. Meanwhile, Jane is deceived and killed by Catherine who fell in love with Bowie. However, Cobra overcomes the 400 degrees below zero temperature because of Jane's love, as Catherine interprets it; he escapes from the prison and gets Jane's corpse. When Bowie is close to open fire on them, Lady arrives and rescues Cobra.

At the request of Professor Toporo, a kind of intellectual mentor from Jane's home planet Myrus, Cobra releases Jane's body into space. Toporo further instructs him to find Jane's other sister Dominique and the "Snow Gorillas". He meets Dominique and she explains that Myrus is a man-made star the Pirate Guild wants to reign over so as to destroy the Seventh Galaxy: Bowie later explains this is a way to demonstrate the Guild's power for as it rules over many galaxies, losing one matters not. Bowie finds them, kills Sandra, the Snow Gorillas' leader, and Dominique who dies in Cobra's hands after having asked him to kill Catherine to prevent the Guild from getting control of Myrus. Cobra is able to escape and goes to Myrus where he confronts Bowie and kills him, releasing Catherine from his control so she can be Myrus' queen. Catherine then joins her sisters Jane and Dominique in death as she self-sacrifices in order to divert the trajectory of Myrus into the nearest sun, while Cobra leaves her world, alone again.

Cast

Production and release
The film is based on Buichi Terasawa's 1978 manga Cobra, specifically on Cobra involvement with the Royal Sisters, and his fight against Crystal Boy, which was the first major arc of manga. It was theatrically released on July 23, 1982, in Japan. In Japan, the film was first released in December 1991 in VHS format. It was released on DVD on June 25, 2001 by Digital Site, and re-released by Happinet on August 29, 2008. Manga Entertainment released the film in British theaters in 1995. The Manga Entertainment version's dub had an alternate soundtrack performed by the pop group Yello. An American dub was created by Carl Macek's Streamline Pictures and uses the original Japanese soundtrack, and was released in American theaters on August 20, 1995, by Tara, and was later distributed by Urban Vision on VHS format on June 16, 1998. The film was released in the Australasian region by Madman Entertainment on December 5, 2007. On April 8, 2008, Manga Entertainment released it on DVD. On January 3, 2012, Hulu started to host the English dubbed version of the film after an agreement with TMS. Discotek Media released the film in the United States on DVD on August 21, 2012, and on Blu-Ray on December 15, 2015, and released the movie on 4K Ultra HD Blu-ray in November 26, 2019, thus becoming the second domestically-produced anime release in that format, only after the German release of Your Name.

Reception and legacy

Otaku USAs Daryl Surat wrote that Cobra is a type of classical pulp series. While declared its protagonist is "part Han Solo and part Sean Connery-era James Bond" who does not fit the modern-day anime hero standard. Surat also said, "when people speak of the 1980s as 'the golden age of anime sci-fi, it's because of things like Space Adventure Cobra". Sandra Scholes of Active Anime commented it reminded "Barbarella, Zardoz and Star Wars all mixed together." Writing in the Fandom Post, Darius Washington thought it was "more like the Derek Flint films" than James Bond and that Cobra's adventures "could be comparable to worlds depicted in Outlaw Star and Bodacious Space Pirates." T. Strife from Anime News Network praised it for staying true to the manga and "holding its own with a modern audience". Strife stated that the series carries a theme of "love as a power beyond compare", which battles with the main character's playboyish air. Overall, Strife said the movie is a masterpiece and classic that is worth viewing to know the medium's foundations. On the other hand, Charles Packer of Sci-Fi Online called the plot pure nonsense and the dialogue almost laughable. He said that the animation looks like a Saturday morning cartoon, stating it crosses between that of an old anime and a new one, complete with interesting "psychedelic moments".

Matthew Sweet's 1991 music video "Girlfriend" used excerpts from the film, and became one of the most-watched videos on MTV.

References

External links

1982 anime films
Anime films based on manga
Cobra (manga)
Discotek Media
Films set on fictional planets
Japanese animated science fiction films
Space opera films
TMS Entertainment
Films directed by Osamu Dezaki